Tomás Romano Pereira Santos Händel (born 27 November 2000) is a Portuguese professional footballer who plays as a midfielder for the club Vitória Guimarães in the Primeira Liga.

Club career
Born in Guimarães, Händel was a youth player at local Moreirense and Vitória Guimarães. He signed his first professional contract with the latter on 27 March 2019, lasting until 2023 and with a buyout clause of €15 million. He made his professional debut in a 4–1 Taça da Liga first round home win over Leixões on 26 July 2021; he played the full 90 minutes. On 22 August, he played his first Primeira Liga game, the entirety of a 4–0 win over Vizela at the Estádio D. Afonso Henriques.

In February 2022, Händel suffered a left thigh injury, ruling him out of the rest of the season and the start of the next.

International career
Born in Portugal, Händel is of Austrian descent through his grandfather. He was called up to the Portugal under-19 team in February 2019, but was not capped until playing three games for the under-21 team in late 2021, starting in a 1–0 win over Belarus in Amadora on 6 September.

References

External links
 
 
 

2000 births
Living people
Sportspeople from Guimarães
Portuguese footballers
Portuguese people of Austrian descent
Vitória S.C. players
Vitória S.C. B players
Primeira Liga players
Campeonato de Portugal (league) players
Association football midfielders
Portugal under-21 international footballers